"Don't Start Now" is a BoA's first recut single. It reached number 17 on the Japan Oricon charts.

Track listing 
 Don't Start Now (Japanese Version)
 Don't Start Now (Korean Version)
 Don't Start Now (English Version)
 ID; Peace B (Jonathan Peter's Club Mix)
 Don't Start Now (Instrumental)

Original Version
The initial recording of "Don't Start Now" as written by Jeff Vincent and Peter Rafelson can be heard on the 2001 eponymous album by American pop singer Brooke Allison, titled "Toodle-oo". The only difference between "Toodle-oo" and BoA's English version is the line, "Time for you to find a ho in hosiery," is altered to BoA's more age-appropriate line, "Time for you to find another fantasy."

Charts

References

BoA songs
2002 singles
Korean-language songs
Japanese-language songs
2002 songs
Avex Trax singles